Muhammad bin Fahd Al Saud ( Muḥammad bin Fahd Āl Suʿūd; born 1950) is a Saudi prince, politician, and philanthropist who served as governor of the Eastern Province of Saudi Arabia from 1985 to 2013. He is a prince of the second generation of the royal family.

Early life and education
Born in Riyadh in 1950, Muhammad bin Fahd is the second son of King Fahd.

Muhammad bin Fahd received his school education in the Capital Model Institute. He continued his university education in the University of California, Santa Barbara where he received a bachelor's degree in economics and political sciences.

Career and philanthropy
After graduating, Muhammad bin Fahd worked in the private sector but was gradually introduced to multiple public assignments. During the early 1970s he was a major stakeholder of the Al Bilad conglomerate. Then he was appointed as assistant deputy minister of interior. In 1985, he was named governor of the Eastern Province, and his tenure ended in 2013.

In 1999, he established the Prince Muhammad bin Fahd Foundation for Humanitarian Development, which has launched various humanitarian projects. Among other things, this foundation established the SHIFAA fund, which helps people get medical treatment. He also launched a private university in the Eastern Province, Prince Mohammad University.

In 2016, Muhammad bin Fahd received an honorary doctorate of public service from the University of Central Florida in the United States.

Personal life
Muhammad bin Fahd married Jawaher bint Nayef bin Abdulaziz, with whom he had six children: Prince Turki (born 1979), Prince Khaled (born 1984), Prince Abdulaziz (born 1991), Princess Nouf (born 1975), Princess Noura (born 1981) and Princess Mashael (born 1988).

References

Muhammad
Muhammad
Muhammad
Muhammad
1950 births
Muhammad
Muhammad
Living people
People named in the Panama Papers
Muhammad
Muhammad
University of California, Santa Barbara alumni